Khwaja Ghiyath al-Din Muhammad Hafiz Razi (d. April/May 1422) was an Iranian statesman and military commander who served the Timurid Empire in the early 15th-century.

A native of the city of Yazd in southern Iran, Hafiz Razi was a Sufi who had memorized the Quran and could speak seven languages. His career started under the service of the Timurid prince Iskandar, who appointed him as his deputy. According to the Mu'izz al-ansab, Hafiz Razi was also Iskandar's chief vizier.

References

Sources 
 
 

Officials of the Timurid Empire
Viziers of the Timurid Empire
15th-century Iranian people
1422 deaths
14th-century births
People from Yazd
Generals of the Timurid Empire